Esteban Edward Torres (January 27, 1930 – January 25, 2022) was an American politician who served as member of the United States House of Representatives for California's 34th congressional district from 1983 to 1999.

Early life
Torres was born in Miami, Arizona, to parents from Mexico. He was raised in East Los Angeles, California mostly by his mother, Rena Gómez. His father was a miner, but was deported to Mexico during the Mexican Repatriation of the 1930s. He graduated from East Los Angeles College and California State University, Los Angeles, and later took graduate courses at the University of Maryland, College Park and American University.

Career
He served in the United States Army from 1949 to 1953. Active in the labor movement, he was appointed United States Ambassador to the United Nations Educational, Scientific and Cultural Organization (UNESCO), Paris, France, from 1977 to 1979 and served as a special assistant to President Jimmy Carter from 1979 to 1981.

Torres was unsuccessful in his attempt to win a seat in the House of Representatives in 1974, but was elected in 1982 as a Democrat. He served from 1983 until 1999. During his time in office, he prioritized issue related to Hispanics, and in 1986 he played a key role in the development and passage of the Immigration Reform and Control Act.

He did not run for reelection in 1998 and was succeeded by Democrat Grace Napolitano. He served as a member of the California Transportation Commission from 1997 to 2007.

Personal life and death
Torres and his wife, Arcy Sanchez, had four children. He died on January 25, 2022, two days shy of his 92nd birthday.

Legacy and Awards
 Esteban E. Torres NCLR-Harvard Mid-Career Fellowship Program - a partnership between NCLR and the John F. Kennedy School of Government
 Esteban Torres High School
In 2001, Torres was awarded an honorary Doctor of Humane Letters (L.H.D.) degree from Whittier College.

See also
 List of Hispanic and Latino Americans in the United States Congress

References

External links

 

|-

1930 births
2022 deaths
20th-century American politicians
California State University, Los Angeles alumni
American politicians of Mexican descent
Hispanic and Latino American diplomats
Hispanic and Latino American members of the United States Congress
Democratic Party members of the United States House of Representatives from California
Military personnel from Arizona
Military personnel from California
People from East Los Angeles, California
People from Miami, Arizona
Place of death missing
Politicians from Los Angeles
Permanent Delegates of the United States to UNESCO
United States Army soldiers